"Rattle" is a song by Dutch dance duo Bingo Players. It was written and produced by Maarten Hoogstraten and Paul Bäumer. It was released in the Netherlands as a digital download on 31 October 2011, and worldwide on 6 February 2012, alongside the Candyland remix. The song has charted in Austria, the Netherlands and France.

In 2012, Bingo Players collaborated with Far East Movement for a revamped and remixed version of the song entitled "Get Up (Rattle)" that became an even bigger hit for the Bingo Players worldwide.

In 2013, Rattle was also used as the melody sample on Alexis Jordan's song Acid Rain.

DJ duo, Candyland won a remix contest for the track on the electronic music website Beatport. The song was released as its own single and also on an EP.

Track listing

Chart performance

Certifications

Release history

References

2011 singles
Bingo Players songs
Songs written by Maarten Hoogstraten
Songs written by Paul Bäumer (musician)